Randall v. Sorrell, 548 U.S. 230 (2006), is a decision by the Supreme Court of the United States involving a Vermont law which placed a cap on financial donations made to politicians. The court ruled that Vermont's law, the strictest in the nation, unconstitutionally hindered the citizens' First Amendment right to free speech. A key issue in the case was the 1976 case Buckley v. Valeo, which many justices felt needed to be revisited.

Opinion of the Court 
The 6–3 ruling dealt with three individual issues before the court.

Did Vermont's law violate the First Amendment, Fourteenth Amendment, following the Supreme Court ruling in Buckley v. Valeo, which struck down limits on campaign expenditures as unconstitutional?
Did Vermont violate the right of political parties to make independent expenditures in accordance with the aforementioned amendments, following the Supreme Court ruling in Colorado Republican Federal Campaign Committee v. FEC?
Did Vermont's contribution limits, which are the lowest in the country, allow only a single maximum contribution over a two-year election cycle, and prohibit state political parties from contributing more than $400 to their gubernatorial candidate, fall below an acceptable constitutional threshold and should be struck down?  In Buckley, the Supreme Court had upheld contribution limits on the basis of the government's "compelling interest" in preventing political corruption or its appearance, but had left open the possibility that if limits were set so low as to prevent speakers from effectively presenting their message to the public, such limits might be unconstitutional.

The State of Vermont argued that new circumstances and experiences since Buckley v. Valeo was decided in 1976 suggested that the law should be upheld as Constitutional. 

The Supreme Court ruled against the state of Vermont on all three issues, reaffirming both Buckley and Colorado Republican Federal Campaign Committee and striking down the law as unconstitutional.  Randall is particularly important as the first case in which the Supreme Court has struck down a contribution limit as unconstitutionally low.

See also 
James Bopp

Further reading

References

External links 
 
Ohio State Law Journal Symposium on Randall v. Sorrell

United States Supreme Court cases
United States Supreme Court cases of the Roberts Court
United States Free Speech Clause case law
United States elections case law
2006 in United States case law